The West Springfield Generating Station, also known by its corporate name EP Energy Massachusetts, LLC, is a fossil-fuel-fired power plant located in West Springfield, Massachusetts. The station is a "peaking" facility, meaning that it primarily operates during peak electrical demand. The facility consists of two 49-megawatt (MW) combustion turbine generators (Units 1 and 2) fueled by natural gas or ultra low-sulphur diesel fuel, one 18 MW jet turbine (Unit 10) that is fueled by kerosene, and one 107 MW simple-cycle steam boiler unit (Unit 3) burning no. 6 fuel oil, ULSD or natural gas. The station also has a small auxiliary boiler for process and building heat and an emergency back-up generator. The station's management also operates several small remote power generators including two other jet turbines identical to West Springfield 10 which are the Doreen Street unit in Pittsfield, Massachusetts, and Woodland Road unit in Lee, Massachusetts as well as five run-of-river hydroelectric power stations located on the Chicopee and Deerfield Rivers.

Information
The station is located south of the Memorial Bridge in West Springfield, Massachusetts. The power plant and the adjacent West Springfield Substation were built in 1949 by Western Massachusetts Electric Company, a subsidiary of Northeast Utilities. The original station consisted of two simple-cycle steam units (Units 1 and 2) which burned both oil and coal at different periods of their existence. Unit 3 was added in 1957 and the jet turbine was added in 1969. In 1999 the Station was acquired by Con Edison and the plant's corporate name became Con Edison Energy Massachusetts, Inc. By that time, the plant had become a reserve facility only used at times of very high system load. In 2002, Con Edison converted the plant into a peaking facility by replacing the original boiler Units 1 and 2 with the current combustion turbines. The facility does not operate often and is primarily used to maintain grid reliability in the area. Due to the current New England market conditions, none of the plant's units have fared well revenue-wise in recent years, but in 2005 it was determined by ISO New England that the station was needed for reliability purposes and CEEMI was awarded Reliability Must Run agreements in 2005 from ISO New England for the station's units. In RMR agreements, the electricity market agrees to subsidize the costs of operating units which are deemed necessary but are unable to make enough revenue to pay operational costs. Generally these are paid for by increasing electricity rates to customers. In 2008, Con Edison sold CEEMI to North American Energy Alliance, Inc. now known as Essential Power LLC, which is a joint venture owned by AllCapital and IFM. Essential Power was subsequently acquired by Cogentrix Energy, under ownership of funds managed by The Carlyle Group.

Steam Units 1 and 2 are permanently retired as of December 31, 2000 (last used in 1999) and the boilers are currently being decommissioned. During the decommissioning of Units 1 and 2 and installation of CTG-1 and CTG-2, the plant's coal chute located on the outside of the boiler hall was removed and the original brick exhaust stacks were replaced with metallic stacks. The two simple-cycle, gas-fired combustion turbine generators (CTGs) having a total nominal capacity of 98 MW were installed and began operating June 5, 2002. Gas turbines are capable of starting up and responding much faster to changing electricity demand than steam units, thus the CTGs are much more desirable as peaking units than the original boilers. In addition, the CTGs emit far less air pollution and require far less cooling water. Each exhaust housing contains selective catalytic reduction (SCR) and an oxidation catalyst system for the control of nitrogen oxides (NOx). The company did not install a heat recovery steam generator with these units.

The plant uses the Connecticut River as its source of cooling water. Unit 3, as a steam unit, has to reject waste heat from its condenser to a water source. A once-through cooling system utilizing water from the river removes waste heat from Unit 3's condenser. The circulating water pumps are located in the plant's pump house across the highway from the facility directly on the Connecticut River. Unit 3 can require up to 6 million gallons per day of water when operating. Units 1, 2, and 10 reject all of their waste heat from combustion to the atmosphere via the exhaust stacks. However, Units 1 and 2 do require a small amount of cooling water to remove heat from the lubricating oil system for the turbines. A small service water system operating at 730 gpm continuously provides cooling water for that purpose. Unit 10 does not require any cooling water at all.

Units 1 and 2 have an operational constraint of 4800 hours/year based on the Massachusetts Department of Environmental Protection (MA DEP) Air Quality Plan Approval. The MA DEP has recently granted approval to NAEA to operate the units an additional 720 hours per year using distillate fuel oil. According to the plant management, Unit 3 is also still operating at about 10–20% of its capacity.

Electricity is supplied to the grid at the adjacent Northeast Utilities-owned substation located directly behind the plant. All four units generate power at 13.8 kilovolts (kV). Units 1 and 10 supply power directly via the 13.8 kV local distribution system fed out of the substation. Unit 3, and since 2002 unit 2, supply power to the 115 kV transmission switchyard at the substation via generator step-up transformers (GSU). The plant can be started with no off-site power available and with only the on-site emergency diesel generator providing electricity to plant systems. As a result, the West Springfield plant is capable of starting and supplying power to local loads in the event of a complete grid failure or in the event that the utility substation through which it transmits power is isolated from the rest of the grid.

Owned by Cogentrix Energy, the West Springfield Generating Station is located at 15 Agawam Ave. in West Springfield, Massachusetts.

Installed equipment

References

Energy infrastructure completed in 1949
Energy infrastructure completed in 1957
Energy infrastructure completed in 1969
Oil-fired power stations in Massachusetts
Natural gas-fired power stations in Massachusetts
Industrial buildings and structures in Massachusetts
West Springfield, Massachusetts
1949 establishments in Massachusetts